Silvio García Rendon (October 11, 1913 – August 28, 1977) was a Cuban baseball shortstop and pitcher in the Negro leagues, Mexican League, and minor leagues. He played professionally from 1930 to 1954 with several ballclubs, including the Diablos Rojos del México, Azules de Veracruz México and the New York Cubans.

References

External links
 and Seamheads
Negro League Player's Association

1913 births
1977 deaths
Azules de Veracruz players
Havana Cubans players
Navegantes del Magallanes players
Cuban expatriate baseball players in Venezuela
New York Cubans players
Rojos del Águila de Veracruz players
Sherbrooke Athletics players
Cuban expatriate baseball players in Canada
Cuban expatriate baseball players in the United States
Cuban expatriate baseball players in Mexico
Cuban expatriate baseball players in Nicaragua